Taksim Surp Harutyun Church, is an Armenian Church in the Beyoğlu district of Istanbul. The original date of first construction is not known but the church was removed in 1846, closed down in 1890 and rebuilt in 1895 by the architects Hovhannes and Mıgırdiç Esayan.

References 

Armenian Apostolic churches in Istanbul
Armenian buildings in Turkey